Orotermes is a genus of moths of the family Erebidae. The genus was erected by Paul Dognin in 1919. The species are found in French Guiana.

Species
Orotermes hermieri Barbut & Lalanne-Cassou, 2007
Orotermes monstrosa Dognin, 1919
Orotermes japyx (Schaus, 1914)

References

Calpinae